The Micro-Satellite à traînée Compensée pour l'Observation du Principe d'Equivalence (Micro-Satellite with Compensated Drag for Observing the Principle of Equivalence, MICROSCOPE) is a  class minisatellite operated by CNES to test the universality of free fall (the equivalence principle) with a precision to the order of , 100 times more precise than can be achieved on Earth. It was launched on 25 April 2016 alongside Sentinel-1B and other small satellites, and was decommissioned around 18 October 2018 after completion of its science objectives.  The final report was published in 2022.

Experiment
To test the equivalence principle (i.e. the similarity of free fall for two bodies of different composition in an identical gravity field), two differential accelerometers are used successively. If the equivalence principle is verified, the two sets of masses will be subjected to the same acceleration. If different accelerations have to be applied, the principle will be violated.

The principal experiment is the Twin-Space Accelerometer for Gravity Experiment (T-SAGE), built by ONERA and composed of two identical accelerometers and their associated, concentric cylindrical masses. One accelerometer serves as a reference and contains two platinum-rhodium alloy masses, while the other is the test instrument and contains two masses with different neutron–proton ratios: one mass of platinum-rhodium alloy and another mass of titanium-aluminium-vanadium alloy (TA6V).  The masses are maintained within their test areas by electrostatic repulsion, designed to render them motionless with respect to the satellite.

It is necessary to create a thermally benign environment for the accelerometers. To that end, a Sun-synchronous orbit provides constant illumination; the experiments are mounted on the end of the satellite bus away from the Sun; and to maintain thermal isolation from the satellite itself, the modes of thermal connection were modelled and wire connections were minimised.

Satellite control
The satellite employs a Drag-Free Attitude Control System (DFACS), also called the Acceleration and Attitude Control System (AACS), that uses a double-redundant primary and backup set of four microthrusters (sixteen total) to "fly" the satellite around the test masses. This system takes into account the dynamic forces acting on the spacecraft, including aerodynamic forces due to residual atmosphere, solar pressure forces due to photon impacts, electromagnetic forces within the Earth's magnetosphere, and gravitational forces in the Sun-Earth-Moon system.

Launch
MICROSCOPE was successfully launched on 25 April 2016 at 21:02:13 UTC from the Guiana Space Centre outside Kourou, French Guiana. It was carried by a Soyuz ST-A booster with a Fregat-M upper stage. Other payloads on this flight were the European Space Agency's Sentinel-1B Earth observation satellite and three CubeSats: OUFTI-1 from the University of Liège, e-st@r-II from the Polytechnic University of Turin, and AAUSAT-4 from Aalborg University.

Results
On 4 December 2017, the first results were published.

End of mission
After completing its mission goals and exhausting its supply of nitrogen fuel, the decommissioning of MICROSCOPE was announced on 18 October 2018. The spacecraft was first passivated, then two  IDEAS (Innovative DEorbiting Aerobrake System) inflatable booms were deployed to passively de-orbit the spacecraft by creating a higher drag profile. By this method, MICROSCOPE is expected to re-enter Earth's atmosphere within 25 years instead of 73 years.

See also

 Tests of general relativity

References

External links
 MICROSCOPE website at CNES.fr

General relativity
European Space Agency satellites
Satellites orbiting Earth
Spacecraft launched by Soyuz-2 rockets
Spacecraft launched in 2016
Secondary payloads